Ilakatra is a town and commune in Madagascar. It belongs to the district of Vohipeno, which is a part of Vatovavy-Fitovinany Region. The population of the commune was estimated to be approximately 17,000 in 2001 commune census.

Primary and junior level secondary education are available in town. The majority 99% of the population of the commune are farmers.  The most important crop is rice, while other important products are coffee and cassava. Services provide employment for 1% of the population.

References and notes 

Populated places in Vatovavy-Fitovinany